Wairok Morung Makunga is a politician from Maring tribe of Manipur. He was elected from Tengnoupal Assembly constituency 3 times in 1990, 1995 and 2007 Manipur Legislative Assembly election and has also served briefly as Cabinet Minister in Manipur Legislative Assembly.

References 

1952 births
Living people
Naga people
Indian National Congress politicians from Manipur
Manipur MLAs 2007–2012
Manipur MLAs 1990–1995
Manipur MLAs 1995–2000